Adam Tučný (born 21 May 2002) is a Slovak footballer who plays for MFK Ružomberok in the Fortuna Liga as a forward.

Club career

AS Trenčín
Tučný made his Fortuna Liga debut for AS Trenčín during a home 4:0 victory over Pohronie on 13 June 2020. Tučný came on after 77 minutes of play to replace Osman Bukari, who set the score to the final result of 4:0 earlier in the second half.

Tučný scored his first goal for Trenčín in his 9th appearance in a league fixture against Zemplín Michalovce on 13 December 2020. Similarly, he came on as a substitute after 77 minutes of play, this time replacing Jakub Kadák, as Trenčín was two down. In less than five minutes he narrowed the lead with a left-foot shot only for Milan Corryn to equalise the game after three further minutes and setting the final score at 2:2.

MFK Ružomberok
In June 2022, Tučný signed a three-year deal with Ružomberok.

International career
In December 2022, Tučný was first recognised in a Slovak senior national team nomination and was immediately shortlisted by Francesco Calzona for prospective players' training camp at NTC Senec.

References

External links
 AS Trenčín official club profile 
 Futbalnet profile 
 
 

2002 births
Living people
Sportspeople from Dunajská Streda
Slovak footballers
Slovakia youth international footballers
Slovakia under-21 international footballers
Association football forwards
AS Trenčín players
MFK Ružomberok players
Slovak Super Liga players